Igor Vlasov is a Russian music producer and live PA, was born in 1980 in Volgograd. From early age he started interesting in music, but didn't try to make his own music that time.

Igor's career began with creation of "Squid Project" (further renamed into SPC), which was initially focused on music genres such as: deep house, jazzy house, dub. However, after some time the performer wanted to prove to be in a techno scene and began to write music under his real name.

Igor's music is distinguished by an accurate rhythm, deep chords, dense character of sound and melody - which recognized by many DJs and listeners worldwide.

The discography of the performer contains some albums (CD) and 12" EPs released by several record labels since 2003 to present time.

Igor uses various kinds of music equipment for writing tracks, but likely more analog 70' synths as: "Aelita", "Elektronika EM-25" and some others.

Igor successfully acted with live sets in several night clubs and on radio.

Discography 
note: see full discography at links below.
2003 - Analog Elements CD - Harlequin Recordings Music Group (US) 
2004 - Natural tracks EP 12" - Handheld Records (Switzerland) 
2006 - Our Home EP 12" - ForceTracks (Germany)
2006 - Eulalia EP 12" - D'efchild Productions (US)
2008 - Fellow's Traveller EP 12" - D'efchild Productions (US)
2011 - Salt/Sea LP - Progrezo Records (Colombia)
2013 - Tracks From The Past CD - Datasocket recordings (Russian Federation)

References 
Interview with Igor Vlasov
Igor Vlasov on 44100.com
Discography
Igor Vlasov on De-Bug music magazine
About 'Our Home' release
Eulalia EP
Igor Vlasov on RA (Resident Advisor)
Some other info about producer

External links 
 The page with releases on Beatport.com
 Official site
 Myspace Igor Vlasov's page
 Soundcloud page
 Music

Video 
() 
() 

Musicians from Volgograd
Russian record producers
1980 births
Living people